The African Southern Region Cross Country Championships is an annual international cross country running competition between Southern African nations, organised by the Confederation of African Athletics (CAA). Established in 1997, it is one of three regional cross country championships organised by the CAA, alongside the North and East African Cross Country Championships. 

The competition is one of three senior athletics championships organised for the Southern region, alongside the main African Southern Region Athletics Championships and the African Southern Region Half Marathon Championships.

Senior and under-20 level races are held for both men and women, which have both individual and national team rankings. The championships previously featured senior short races over 4 km, but these were discontinued after 2006, in line with changes to the IAAF World Cross Country Championships programme.

Editions

Champions

Long course

Short course

Junior

References

Confederation of African Athletics competitions
Sport in Southern Africa
Recurring sporting events established in 1997
Annual sporting events
Cross country running competitions